Pipazetate (brand names Dipect, Lenopect, Selvigon, Theratuss, Toraxan), or pipazethate, is a pyridobenzthiazine cough suppressant, closely related to the phenothiazine class. It binds to the sigma-1 receptor with an IC50 value of 190 nM. It also has local anesthetic action, and in large doses can produce seizures.

As the brand name Theratuss, it was approved by the FDA in 1962, on evidence of safety only. It was withdrawn from the US market in 1972 when the manufacturer, E.R. Squibb, and Sons, failed to produce evidence of efficacy. Clinical studies showed that it did not decrease cough frequency at recommended dosages.

Infrequent side effects include nausea, vomiting, drowsiness, fatigue, rash, and tachycardia.

Synthesis
Note: 1-azaphenothiazine is also used for making Prothipendyl & Isothipendyl.

The reaction of 1-azaphenothiazine [261-96-1] (1) with phosgene gives 1-azaphenothiazine-10-carbonyl chloride [94231-78-4] (2). The reaction of this reactive intermediate with 2-[2-(piperidyl)ethoxy]ethanol [3603-43-8] (3) gives the ester, thus completing the synthesis of Pipazethate (4).

References

Antitussives
Sigma receptor ligands
Pyridobenzthiazines
1-Piperidinyl compounds
Carbamates
Ethers
Withdrawn drugs